Ferocactus peninsulae is a barrel cactus in the genus Ferocactus of the family Cactaceae.

Description
This plant is  oval to club-shaped and has 12 to 20 showy, deep ribs. The thorns are grayish-red and have a yellowish or whitish tip.

Distribution
Ferocactus peninsulae is widespread in the Mexican state of Baja California Sur.

Gallery

References

External links
 Biolib.cz: Ferocactus peninsulae
 

peninsulae
Cacti of Mexico
Endemic flora of Mexico
Flora of Baja California Sur
Plants described in 1922